A children's party or kids' party is a party for children such as a birthday party or tea party.  Since medieval times, children have dressed specially for such occasions.

Children's birthday parties originated in Germany as kinderfeste.

Businesses that plan or arrange children's parties have become more common during the 2010s.

It should also be mentioned that kid's parties are a lucrative business. For example, businesses that target these type of events for the most part help by renting all items or necessary equipment such as tables, chairs and inflatable castles.

The popularity of Children's Birthday parties over the last 30 years has helped create the Children's party entertainer industry that provides services for kids parties with some popular ones being; balloon twisting, face-painting, kids magic shows, children's party games and characters for hire.

References

Parties
Party
Birthdays